Pax or PAX may refer to:

Peace
 Peace (Latin: pax)
 Pax (goddess), the Roman goddess of peace
 Pax, a truce term
 Pax (liturgy), a salutation in Catholic and Lutheran religious services
 Pax (liturgical object), an object formerly kissed as a substitute for the Kiss of Peace in the Catholic Mass

Entertainment 
 Pax (1994 film), a Portuguese comedy
 Pax (2011 film), a Norwegian-Swedish drama
 PAX (event), a gamer festival
 Pax (novel), by Sara Pennypacker
 Pax, a fictional organization in Strange New World and elsewhere by Gene Roddenberry
 PAX, a side project of the German band X Marks the Pedwalk
 Pax (album) by Andrew Hill
 Pax TV, which became Ion Television in 2007

Organizations
 Pax Christi International, an international Catholic peace movement
 PAX Association, in Poland
 Pax Forlag, a Norwegian publishing house
 PAX Network, a US television network now known as ION Television
 Pax World Funds, a US mutual fund company
 Pax Labs, a US manufacturer of vaporizers and the Juul electronic cigarette
 Pax, a Russian manufacturer of Ferris wheels and other amusement rides
 Pax Dei: the European Middle Ages Peace and Truce of God movement, an early pacifist movement

Science and technology
 pax (command), a command line program to read and write file archives
 PaX, a Linux kernel security patch introduced in 2000
 Pax genes, a group of genes and their proteins
 Michelin PAX System, an automotive run-flat tire system
 Pax, a generic brand of diazepam available in South Africa
 Pax (spider), a genus of ant spiders

People
 Ferdinand Albin Pax (1858–1942), German botanist 
 Ferdinand Albert Pax (1884–1964), German zoologist, son of the previous

Other uses
 679 Pax, a minor planet orbiting the Sun
 Winter Storm Pax, a 2014 storm in the US
 auxiliary unit of measurement for the number of passengers in shipping and aviation, for guests in the hotel industry and for visitors to events
 Name of one of the months of the ancient Maya calendar

See also
 List of periods of regional peace, enforced by a dominant power:
 Pax Americana, 1945 onward
 Pax Assyriaca, Assyrian Empire, 7th century BCE
 Pax Britannica, 1815–1914
 Pax Europaea, European Union, 1945–2022
 Pax Hispanica, Spanish Empire, 1598–1621
 Pax Mongolica, Mongol Empire, 13th & 14th centuries
 Pax Romana, Roman Empire, 1st & 2nd centuries
 Pax Sinica, China, much of the 1st millennium
 Pax Ottomana, Ottoman Empire, 1299–1699
 Pax Hill, a house in England
 Pax Pamir, a board game set in 19th century Afghanistan
 
 
 Pack (disambiguation)
 Peace (disambiguation)